David (also "Davyd") Abramovich Tyshler (13 June 1927 – 7 June 2014) was a Russian sabreur, part of the first generation of internationally successful Soviet fencers (Olympic bronze medalist in 1956, and five-time World Championship finalist between 1955 and 1959). He is also known as a successful and innovative fencing coach. His notable pupils included Sergey Sharikov, Mark Midler, Mark Rakita, Viktor Sidjak, Viktor Krovopuskov, and Viktor Bazhenov. He choreographed stage and screen combat, and made cameo appearances in Russian cinema.

Early and personal life
Tyshler was Jewish, and was born in Kherson in what is now Ukraine. During World War II his family fled to Moscow, where Tyshler took up fencing.

His son Gennady became a notable fencing coach. His daughter-in-law, épée fencer Natalia Tychler, competed for South Africa at the 2004 Olympics.

Competitive record
Tyshler was a member of the Soviet national sabre team for 11 years.  He was the Soviet individual sabre champion in 1960, and team sabre champion in 1953, 1954, 1956, 1958, and 1959.

Olympics

Tyshler won a bronze medal at the 1956 Summer Olympics in Melbourne at the age of 29 in the team sabre competition.

Tyshler reached the final round in individual sabre at the 1960 Summer Olympics in Rome at the age of 34, finishing in seventh place. He also competed in the team sabre event.

World championship medals

Tyshler won medals in the:

 1955 World Fencing Championships (bronze medal in team sabre) 
 1956 World Fencing Championships
 1957 World Fencing Championships (silver medal in team sabre) 
 1958 World Fencing Championships (silver medals in individual and team sabre), and 
 1959 World Fencing Championships (bronze medal in team sabre).

Coaching career

From 1961 to 1973 Tyshler was the head coach of the Soviet national sabre team, and among his notable pupils were Sergey Sharikov, Viktor Krovopuskov, Mark Midler, Mark Rakita, Viktor Sidyak, and Viktor Bazhenov.  He coached five Olympic champions. He became a Merited Master of Sports of the USSR, and Honoured Trainer of the USSR.

Tyshler opened fencing schools in Russia and South Africa.

René Roch, President of the FIE, honoured Tysher with a gold medal of the FIE for his untiring dedication to the sport of fencing.

Academic career

In 1949 Tyshler graduated from Central State Order of Lenin Institute of Physical Culture (CGOLIFK). In 1983 he was awarded a PhD degree of Doctor of Science in Paedogogical Sciences.  In 1984 Tyshler became a professor in the Fencing and Modern Pentathlon Department at what is currently Russian State University of Physical Education, Sport, Youth and Tourism (RGUFKSiT; CGOLIFK, but after several name changes).  He became Head of the Cathedra of Fencing. In 1995 he won the All-Russian "Sports Elite 1995" contest as "Russia's best scholar in the sphere of Olympic training".

Tyshler wrote over 170 academic publications, including over 40 books, many of which have been translated into English, Spanish, German, French, Polish, Romanian, and Chinese.  He also wrote a book on fencing on stage and screen, and an autobiography. He staged the fencing scenes in a number of Moscow theaters, as well as in Soviet movies including How Czar Peter the Great Married Off His Moor (1978), 31 June (1978), and The Very Same Munchhausen (1979).

Tyshler was chairman of the Board of Directors of the International Charity Fund for Future of Fencing.

Hall of Fame
Tyshler was inducted into the International Jewish Sports Hall of Fame in 2015.

See also
List of select Jewish fencers

References

External links
 Biography
Tyshler Fencing School - homepage
Jews in Sports bio
 Fencing: What a Sportsman Should Know about Refereeing, Tyshler, 1996, 9780620214087

1927 births
2014 deaths
Fencers at the 1956 Summer Olympics
Fencers at the 1960 Summer Olympics
Jewish male sabre fencers
Ukrainian male sabre fencers
Olympic bronze medalists for the Soviet Union
Olympic fencers of the Soviet Union
Olympic medalists in fencing
Sportspeople from Kherson
Soviet Jews
Soviet male sabre fencers
Jewish Ukrainian sportspeople
Medalists at the 1956 Summer Olympics
Russian State University of Physical Education, Sport, Youth and Tourism alumni